USS District of Columbia (SSBN-826) will be the lead boat of the  ballistic missile submarines in the United States Navy, and the first vessel of the Navy to be named for the District of Columbia. 

However, because the Navy had recently decided to extend the service life of the submarine, the new submarine's name had to be changed. On 3 June 2022, the Navy announced that the new submarine would be named USS District of Columbia. 

As of 2022, the vessel is under construction at General Dynamics' Electric Boat facility in Quonset Point, Rhode Island. A keel laying ceremony was held at the shipyard on 4 June 2022.

Mission
The Columbia-class as a whole will take over the role of submarine presence in the United States’ strategic nuclear triad force. A total of 12 submarines are planned, with construction of the lead boat, District of Columbia, beginning in 2021.

Design specification and parameters
In April 2014, the Navy completed a 300-page specification report for the Ohio Replacement Program submarines.

Electric Boat designed the new class with help from Newport News Shipbuilding. Each submarine, beginning with District of Columbia, will have 16 missile tubes, each carrying one UGM-133 Trident II missile. Each Columbia-class nuclear core is designed to last as long as the submarine is in service avoiding the need for nuclear refueling during the vessel's active service life.

Costs and procurement
The design and technology development of the Columbia-class is projected to cost $4.2 billion (fiscal 2010 dollars), although technology and components from the Ohio and  classes are to be included where possible, to save money. The cost to build District of Columbia, the lead boat of the class, will be an estimated $6.2 billion (fiscal 2010 dollars). The Navy has a goal of reducing the average cost of the remaining 11 planned hulls in the class to $4.9 billion each (fiscal 2010 dollars). The total lifecycle cost of the entire class is estimated at $347 billion. The high cost of the submarines is expected to cut deeply into Navy shipbuilding. The Navy procured the first Columbia-class boat in FY2021. On 7 June 2021, the U.S. Navy Budget office announced that the total cost for the first submarine, District of Columbia, would reach $15.03 billion, but that also includes planning costs for the entire program.

Implementation and construction
In March 2016, the U.S. Navy announced that General Dynamics Electric Boat was chosen as the prime contractor and lead design yard. Electric Boat will carry out the majority of the work, on all 12 submarines, including final assembly. All 18 Ohio-class submarines were built at Electric Boat as well. Huntington Ingalls Industries’ Newport News Shipbuilding will serve as the main subcontractor, participating in the design and construction and performing 22 to 23 percent of the required work. In late 2016, some 3,000 employees were involved, in Electric Boat alone, in the detailed design phase of the program, with the procurement for the first submarine established in 2021. Completion of District of Columbia is scheduled for 2030, followed by her entry into service in 2031. All 12 submarines are expected to be completed by 2042 and remain in service until 2085.

Propulsion

Electric drive

District of Columbia will have an electric drive propulsion system that uses an electric motor to turn the propeller of a vessel. It is part of a wider (Integrated electric power) concept whose aim is to create an "all electric vessel". Electric drive should reduce the life-cycle cost of the submarine while at the same time reducing acoustic signature.

In 2014, Northrop Grumman was chosen as the prime designer and manufacturer of the turbine generator units. The turbines convert thermal energy in the steam into mechanical energy, and the generators convert that mechanical energy into electrical energy. The electrical energy is then used for powering onboard systems as well as for propulsion via electric motor.

Weapons

Common missile compartment
In December 2008, General Dynamics Electric Boat Corporation was selected to design the Common Missile Compartment that will be used on the Columbia-class. In 2012, the U.S. Navy announced plans for the class to share a common missile compartment (CMC) design with the Royal Navy's . The CMC will house SLBMs in "quad packs".

References

External Links
 General Dynamics Quonset Point Electric Boat facility
 NavSource: USS Columbia Submarine Image Archive

Columbia-class submarines
Ballistic missile submarines